Leonoor Voskamp (born 20 August 1983) is a Dutch field hockey player, who made her debut for the Dutch National Women's Team on 20 June 2003 during a six-nations tournament in Busan, South Korea. She played for the Dutch hockey club HC Klein Zwitserland from The Hague.

References
  Profile

1983 births
Living people
Dutch female field hockey players
Field hockey players from The Hague
HC Klein Zwitserland players